Upson-Lee High School is a secondary school in Thomaston, Georgia, United States. It is the only high school in Upson County.  It is a combination of the former R. E. Lee Institute and Upson High School, both previously located in Upson County.  Upson-Lee High School serves 1284 students with a diverse and challenging selection of academic and elective courses, Advanced Placement and honors programs, sixteen CTAE (Career, Technical and Agriculture Education) pathways, Navy JROTC, and dual enrollment with Gordon State College and Southern Crescent Technical College. The school offers eighteen varsity sports along with academic teams and clubs.

Facilities
The Thomaston-Upson Board of Education has a Fine Arts Center located on the south side of the school and just east of the parking lots.

Notable alumni

 Coy Bowles - guitarist of Zac Brown Band
 Wayne Cochran - soul singer
 Frank Gordy - founder of The Varsity restaurant chain
 John Holliman - broadcast journalist
 Marion Montgomery - poet
 Martha B. Hudson Pennyman - Olympic athlete
 Travon Walker - Jacksonville Jaguars defensive end

References

External links
 Official site

Public high schools in Georgia (U.S. state)
Schools in Upson County, Georgia
1992 establishments in Georgia (U.S. state)
Educational institutions established in 1992